The 2005 Vodacom Cup was the 8th edition of this annual domestic cup competition. The Vodacom Cup is played between provincial rugby union teams in South Africa from the Currie Cup Premier and First Divisions.

Competition
There were 14 teams participating in the 2005 Vodacom Cup competition. These teams were divided into two sections of equal strength; Section X and Section Y, both with seven teams. Teams would play all the teams in the other section once over the course of the season, either at home or away.

Teams received four points for a win and two points for a draw. Bonus points were awarded to teams that score four or more tries in a game, as well as to teams losing a match by seven points or less. Teams were ranked by points, then points difference (points scored less points conceded).

The top two teams in each section qualified for the semi-finals. In the semi-finals, the teams that finished first in each section had home advantage against the teams that finished fourth and the teams that finished second in each section had home advantage against the teams that finished third. The winners of these semi-finals then played each other in the final.

Teams

Changes from 2004
The Vodacom Shield competition was scrapped and teams were divided into two equally strength groups; Section X and Section Y.

Team Listing
The following teams took part in the 2005 Vodacom Cup competition:

Tables

Section X

Section Y

Results

Round one

Round two

Round three

Round four

Round Five

Round Six

Round Seven

Semi-finals

Final

Winners

References

 

Vodacom Cup
2005 in South African rugby union
2005 rugby union tournaments for clubs